During the 2003–04 season, Newcastle United participated in the FA Premier League. This season saw the club reach the semi-finals of the 2003–04 UEFA Cup.

Newcastle finished 5th in the Premiership at the end of the season, which ensured qualification for the UEFA Cup once again for the 2004–05 season. Many fans were left disgruntled that United did not make it into the Champions League.

Season summary
Newcastle had finished the 2002–03 season third in the Premier League, entering the qualification rounds for the Champions League.

However, Newcastle did not qualify for the Champions League. They beat Partizan Belgrade 1–0 away from home, but then lost 1–0 at St James' Park and were eliminated via the penalty shootout. This defeat dropped Newcastle into the first round of the UEFA Cup.

Newcastle reached the semi finals of the UEFA Cup, defeating Breda, Basel, Vålerenga, Mallorca and PSV in the competition. Newcastle were knocked out by Olympique Marseille in the semi-finals 2–0 on aggregate.

In the league, the team were unable to repeat the success of the previous two seasons as Liverpool pipped them to the fourth Champions League spot in the last week of the season. Newcastle were able to nip in ahead of Aston Villa and Charlton Athletic to take fifth place and qualify for the UEFA Cup.

The club could have finished higher if they hadn't started and ended the season with terrible runs. Newcastle failed to win until October in the league and ended the season by winning only one of their last seven league games. The club's away form was a major Achilles heel, with the club registering only 2 away wins (at Middlesbrough and Fulham in the space of 4 days) and a staggering 12 away draws.

Final league table

Team kit
The team kit for the 2003–04 season was produced by Adidas and the main shirt sponsor was Northern Rock.

Club transfers

In

 Total spending:  £0

Out

 Total spending:  £3,500,000

First-team squad
Squad at end of season

Left club during season

Appearances, goals and cards
(Starting appearances + substitute appearances)

Coaching staff

Results

Pre-season

Premier League

Champions League

UEFA Cup

FA Cup

League Cup

References

External links
FootballSquads - Newcastle United - 2003/04

Newcastle United
Newcastle United F.C. seasons